Arthur McArthur Devlin (October 16, 1879 – September 18, 1948) was an American athlete and coach.

College career
Devlin attended Georgetown University in Washington, D.C., where he played baseball and football. As a senior in 1900, he served as the team captain. He was a standout back, and in 1900 was considered competitive for the Walter Camp All-American team if it had not been restricted to Harvard, Yale, and Princeton players.

Coaching career
He served as the head football coach at North Carolina A&M, now North Carolina State, for the 1902 and 1903 seasons. During that time, Devlin's teams compiled a 7–8–2 record for a winning percentage of .471.

In the early 1920s, Devlin served as the head baseball coach at Fordham University.

In the late 1920s, Devlin served as a basketball coach at the Naval Academy.

Baseball career
Devlin spent most of his nine-year baseball career with the New York Giants, where he started as their third baseman in 1904. In 1905 Devlin stole 59 bases, sharing the National League lead with Billy Maloney of the Chicago Cubs. Devlin was traded to the Boston Braves in 1911, where he played for two years as a backup infielder until his retirement in 1913. Devlin had a short temper and on one occasion in 1910, jumped into the grandstand at the Polo Grounds to beat up a fan who called him a "dog".

In 1313 games over 10 seasons, Devlin posted a .269 batting average (1185-for-4412) with 603 runs, 10 home runs, 508 RBI and 285 stolen bases. Defensively, he recorded a .946 fielding percentage.

Devlin died in Jersey City, New Jersey a month before his 69th birthday.

Head coaching record

Football

See also
 List of Major League Baseball annual stolen base leaders

References

External links

 

1879 births
1948 deaths
National League stolen base champions
Major League Baseball third basemen
Baseball players from Washington, D.C.
New York Giants (NL) players
Boston Braves players
Boston Braves coaches
Wilmington Giants players
Newark Sailors players
New Bern Truckers players
Rochester Hustlers players
Oakland Oaks (baseball) managers
Oakland Oaks (baseball) players
Montreal Royals players
Norfolk Tars players
Fordham Rams baseball coaches
Navy Midshipmen men's basketball coaches
NC State Wolfpack football coaches
Georgetown Hoyas baseball players
Georgetown Hoyas football players
All-Southern college football players